MS SeaFrance Cézanne was a ferry launched in 1979 as the Ariadne. Starting life in the Mediterranean, she has spent the majority of her career serving the Dover-Calais cross channel ferry route with successive operators, Sealink, SNCF & SeaFrance, was taken out of service in February 2009 and scrapped in 2011-12

Early years
The SeaFrance Cézanne started life as the Ariadne, ordered by and for Rederi AB Nordö, Malmö for services in the Eastern Mediterranean. She was launched at the Kockums Varv AB shipyard in Malmö, Sweden on 13 October 1979  and delivered to Rederi AB Nordö in January 1980. In February 1980, she was renamed Soca opening a service between Koper, Yugoslavia and Tartous, Syria with UMEF. On 7 June 1980, the Socas sister ship,  capsized on her maiden voyage roughly 2 km away from Larnaca, Cyprus, this precipitated the end of Rederi's Yugoslavia to Syria service. In late 1981 the two remaining vessels Soca and her sister Scandinavia were sold to Bulgarian So Mejdunaroden Automobile Transport (SOMAT) and the Soca was renamed Trapezitza. Under SOMAT ownership, the Trapezitza was operated using the MedLink brand running trans-Mediterranean services to  the Middle East.

SNCF

In October 1988, under charter to DFDS Seaways, the Trapezitza and her sister, which had been renamed Tzarvetz was purchased by Sealink British Ferries and renamed initially to Fantasia and Fiesta respectively. After a short refit in Bremerhaven in 1989 the Fantasia was again renamed Channel Seaway and began operating a freight service between Dover and Calais. Sealink eventually decided to use the two vessels, in a pooling agreement with SNCF to provide a joint service running between Dover and Calais. As a result of this decision, the Channel Seaway and her sister, now named Fiesta were sent to Lloyd Werft, Bremerhaven in October 1989 to be converted from freight carriers to passenger carriers. As part of the pooling agreement, the Channel Seaway was to be given to SNCF, as a result of this, whilst at Bremerhaven, the two vessels swapped names, the Channel Seaway becoming the Fiesta. The Fiesta returned to Calais on 13 May 1990, however due to French industrial action, did not enter service until 9 July 1990. In 1989 ownership of the vessel transferred to Societé Nouvelle d'Armement Transmanche (SNAT) and then in 1990, SNCF transferred the operations to Societé Propietaire des Navaires (SPN). In August 1990, SPN and Sealink British Ferries signed an extension of 5 years to their pooling agreement on board the Fiesta in Dover harbour. The early 1990s was a difficult time for the Fiesta, her services frequently being interrupted by industrial action, most notably in June/July 1991, April 1992 and February 1995.

SeaFrance

In July 1995, SPN & SNAT announced their intention to terminate the pooling agreement from 31 December. On 1 January 1996 SNCF new SeaFrance service began, with the Fiesta, which was renamed to SeaFrance Cézanne in her January 1996 refit. On 22 March 2000, during thick fog, the SeaFrance Cézanne was holed on the port side, which later required attention at Dunkerque.

Following the introduction of the SeaFrance Rodin in 2001 and the SeaFrance Berlioz in 2005, the SeaFrance Cézanne was relegated to freight only duties alongside the SeaFrance Nord Pas-De-Calais. Following the publication of a revised schedule in 2006, she was promoted back to passenger duties, maintaining this position until the introduction of the SeaFrance Molière in late 2008 where she was again relegated to freight only crossings. In early 2009, she was permanently withdrawn from service on 12 February  and was laid up in Dunkerque two days later.

In 2011 the ship was sold to Belize interests and renamed the Western Light. In October 2011 she departed from Dunkerque for Alang, India for scrapping.

Sister ships
The SeaFrance Cézanne had two sister ships:
  - Operating as the Wawel Gdańsk-Nynashamn with Polferries
  - Capsized on maiden voyage in June 1980

References

External links
 

Ferries of the United Kingdom
Ferries of France
Ships built in Malmö
1979 ships